was a Japanese manga artist known for dealing with controversial and incendiary topics in many of his works. He was born the second boy of five siblings. He had an older brother and older sister, as well as a younger brother and younger sister. His father was Korean and an artificial flower craftsman.

Biography
Akiyama quit high school and moved to Tokyo to become a manga artist. After working briefly as a book wholesaler, he became an assistant for manga artist Kenji Morita. He made his major debut in 1966 with the gag-manga Gaikotsu-kun, which was published in Bekkan Shōnen Magazine, and shocked readers in 1970 with Ashura, which contained numerous unsettling depictions of human life. The first chapter of Ashura contains a scene where a woman commits cannibalism to prevent herself from dying of starvation, and later attempts to eat her own child as well. The August 2, 1970, edition of Weekly Shōnen Magazine, which first published this chapter, was banned in several regions as a result of this scene, propelling Akiyama to infamy within the manga industry. Akiyama continued his career with Kokuhaku (lit. "Confessions"), which began serialization in the 11th edition of Weekly Shōnen Sunday in 1971. This manga took on an unprecedented format where Akiyama would make a confession each week (for instance, in one chapter he confesses that he is a murderer), only to admit that his confession was a lie in the following week's chapter. After repeating this for the duration of the manga, Akiyama suddenly announced his retirement, cutting off all of the serializations he held on various magazines to embark on a solo journey across Japan.

Akiyama came out of retirement only 3 months later with Bara no Sakamichi, which began serialization in the 34th edition of Weekly Shōnen Jump in 1971. He started his longest work, Haguregumo, on Big Comic Original, which won him the Shogakukan Manga Award in 1979. The series ended in 2017, and spanned 112 volumes since its inception in 1973. The series was also adapted into an anime film by Toei Animation and Madhouse in 1982.

Akiyama died on May 12, 2020, at the age of 77 of unspecified causes.

Notable works

References

External links
 Official Website  
 

1943 births
2020 deaths
Manga artists from Tochigi Prefecture
Japanese people of Korean descent